South Plaza (Spanish: Isla Plaza Sur) is a small island off the east coast of Santa Cruz in the Galápagos Islands. It has an area of 0.13 km2 and a maximum altitude of 23 metres.

South Plaza was formed by lava up streaming from the bottom of the ocean. Despite its small size, it is home to a large number of species and known for its extraordinary flora. The sea bluffs hold large numbers of birds, such as nesting red-billed tropicbirds and swallow-tailed gulls, and offer wide vistas. The prickly pear cactus trees (Opuntia galapageia) are noteworthy, as is the large colony of Galápagos land iguanas. Furthermore, the territory and breeding season of the Galapagos land iguana overlap only on South Plaza Island with those of the marine iguana, giving rise to a unique population of hybrid iguanas. Depending on the season, the Sesuvium ground vegetation changes its colour from green in the rainy season to orange and purple in the dry season.

References

Islands of the Galápagos Islands
Island restoration